Danny Beard is the stage name of Daniel Curtis, a British drag performer and singer, who appeared on Britain's Got Talent and Karaoke Club: Drag Edition and won the fourth series of RuPaul's Drag Race UK.

Biography
Danny Beard was born in Liverpool, England and now resides in Manchester. In 2016, they auditioned for the tenth series of Britain's Got Talent and reached the semi-finals. In 2021, they were a contestant on Karaoke Club: Drag Edition and finished in fourth place. Danny Beard won the fourth series of RuPaul's Drag Race UK. They are the sixth bearded queen to appear in the franchise and the first to be judged by RuPaul. In March 2023, they made a cameo in the Channel 4 soap opera, Hollyoaks.

Filmography

Discography

References

Living people
20th-century LGBT people
21st-century LGBT people
English drag queens
Gay entertainers
People from Liverpool
RuPaul's Drag Race UK winners
Year of birth missing (living people)